Gillam Airport  is located adjacent to Gillam, Manitoba, Canada.

Airlines and destinations

See also
Gillam Water Aerodrome

References

External links
Page about this airport on COPA's Places to Fly airport directory

Certified airports in Manitoba